Aminoacylase 1 deficiency is a rare inborn error of metabolism. To date only 21 cases have been described.

Signs and symptoms

The clinical picture is heterogeneous and includes motor delay, seizures, moderate to severe mental retardation, absent speech, growth delay, muscular hypotonia and autistic features.

Genetics

This disorder in inherited in an autosomal recessive fashion.

Molecular biology

Aminoacylase 1 (ACY1: EC 3.5.14) is a zinc binding enzyme which hydrolyzes N-acetyl amino acids into the free amino acid and acetic acid. Of the N-acetyl amino hydrolyzing enzymes, aminoacylase 1 is the most common.

The ACY1 gene is located on the short arm of chromosome 3 (3p21.2).

Diagnosis
There is a specific pattern of N-acetyl amino acid excretion in the urine. The diagnosis can be confirmed by sequencing of the aminoacylase 1 gene.

Treatment

History

This disorder was first reported in 2005.

References

External links 

Amino acid metabolism disorders
Autosomal recessive disorders
Genetics